FLY Entertainment is a Singapore-based entertainment agency, specialising in services for the entertainment industry in Singapore and the region. Divisions include Artiste Management, Event Management and Marketing & Public Relations, in addition to several fully owned subsidiaries.

History 
FLY Entertainment (飞艺娱乐) was founded in 1999 by local host and comedian, Irene Ang.

People signed with FLY 
 Constance Lau, Singaporean actress and model

External links
Fly Entertainment Website

Talent and literary agencies